Imagine is a 2012 Polish drama film directed by Andrzej Jakimowski.

Plot
A blind teacher breaks the rules to help a female student rediscover the pleasures of life.

Cast
 Edward Hogg as Ian
 Alexandra Maria Lara as Eva
 João Vaz as José
 Melchior Derouet as Serrano
 Francis Frappat as Doctor
 João Lagarto as Brother Humberto

Release
Imagine was released in:
 Poland on 13 October 2012 at the Warsaw Film Festival.

Awards
Polish Film Awards (2014)
 Guillaume LeBras and Jacek Hamela were nominated and won the Eagle award for the Best Sound.

Seattle International Film Festival (2013)
 Edward Hogg was nominated for a Golden Space Needle Award for Best Actor at the Seattle International Film Festival in 2013.

Warsaw International Film Festival (2012)
 Andrzej Jakimowski was nominated and won the Audience Award for Feature Film.  
 Andrzej Jakimowski was nominated and won the Best Director award.  
 Andrzej Jakimowski was nominated for the Grand Prix award.

References

External links
 
 Official website

2012 films
Polish drama films
Films about blind people
2012 drama films
2010s English-language films
English-language Polish films